"Un'emozione per sempre" is a song recorded by Italian singer Eros Ramazzotti and released in May 2003 as the lead single from his studio album 9. The song was written by Ramazzotti, Claudio Guidetti, Maurizio Fabrizio and Adelio Cogliati, and it was produced by Ramazzotti and Guidetti. 

The single became a commercial success, reaching the top spot of the charts in Italy and Switzerland, and entering the charts in several other European countries. The single was also certified platinum in Italy, with domestic sales exceeding 60,000 units. The Spanish-language version of the song, recorded by Ramazzotti himself and titled "Una emoción para siempre", peaked at number five on the US Billboard Latin Songs chart.

The single's accompanying music video, directed by Martin Weisz, received a nomination for Best Videoclip at the Italian Music Awards in October 2003.

Background
"Un'emozione per sempre" is a love song, dealing with the feelings of somebody who is facing the end of a relationship and describing the emotions that the lovestory leaves in his life. 
Il Corriere della Seras Mario Luzzatto Fegiz described the song as "a sunny and catchy tune, in Ramazzotti's typical style", in which he sings about a man that, despite his instinct to use bitter and painful words with his former partner, prefers to remember the happy moments he lived during the relationship.

Ramazzotti, who had separated a few months earlier from Swiss televeision hostess and model Michelle Hunziker, denied the song was inspired by his personal life, claiming it was written before the end of his marriage, and initially recorded as an unreleased demo by Italian singer Alex Baroni, shortly before the end of the relationship between Baroni and fellow singer Giorgia.

Artwork
The front cover of the single features a photograph by Fabrizio Ferri, showing Ramazzotti's shoulders and highlighting the tattoo on the back of his neck, representing some Japanese ideographs meaning "Michelle", the name of his former wife, Michelle Hunziker. Hunziker denied speculations that the tattoo was an attempt by Ramazzotti to reconquer her love, claiming it was made before the beginning of their sentimental crisis.

Track listing
 CD single'
 "Un'emozione per sempre" (Eros Ramazzotti, Claudio Guidetti, Adelio Cogliati, Maurizio Fabrizio) – 3:59
 "Una emoción para siempre" (Eros Ramazzotti, Claudio Guidetti, Adelio Cogliati, Maurizio Fabrizio) – 3:59
 "Un angelo non è" (Live) (Eros Ramazzotti, Claudio Guidetti, Adelio Cogliati) – 5:22

Charts

Peak positions

Year-end charts

Release history

References

2003 singles
Eros Ramazzotti songs
Italian-language songs
Spanish-language songs
Number-one singles in Italy
Number-one singles in Hungary
Number-one singles in Switzerland
Songs written by Eros Ramazzotti
Songs written by Claudio Guidetti
Songs written by Maurizio Fabrizio
2003 songs
Ariola Records singles
Music videos directed by Martin Weisz